American Indians of Iowa include numerous Native American tribes and prehistoric cultures that have lived in this territory for thousands of years. There has been movement both within the territory, by prehistoric cultures that descended into historic tribes, and by other historic tribes that migrated into the territory from eastern territories. In some cases they were pushed by development pressure and warfare.

Prehistoric period

Chiwere-Siouan speaking tribes

Ho-Chunk (Winnebago; often classified as Hochunk-Siouan speakers)
Ioway (Baxoje)
Missouria
Otoes
The Chiwere-speaking tribes are descended from the prehistoric Oneota culture. At the time of contact with European explorers, their range covered most of Iowa. The Ho-Chunk ranged primarily east of the Mississippi in southern Wisconsin, the Ioway/Baxoje ranged in northern Iowa, the Otoe in central and southern Iowa, and the Missouria in far southern Iowa. All these tribes were also active during the historic period.

Dhegihan-Siouan speaking tribes

The following tribes arrived in the late prehistoric period:
Kaw (Kansa)
Omaha
Osage
Ponca
The Dhegiha lived near the Missouri in the very Late Prehistoric and historic periods; they appear to have migrated to the region from the south or southeast. Their origin location is debated.

Other Siouan-language-speaking tribes
The following tribes are of the late prehistoric and historic period:
Hidatsa
Mandan
These may be descendants of Late Prehistoric Mill Creek cultures, whose range extended into northwest Iowa. Their territory was wide; the Lewis and Clark expedition reported on Mandan villages on the upper Missouri River.

Dakotan-Siouan speakers
Santee Sioux
Yankton Sioux
The Dakota pushed southward into much of Iowa in the 18th and 19th centuries. They were frequently seen by European-American settlers. In 1840, the translator Isaac Galland noted several Sioux groups in or near Iowa, including Wahpekute, North Sisseton, South Sisseton, East Wahpetonwan, West Wahpetonwan, Yankton, and Mdewakantonwan.

Historic period

Caddoan-speaking tribes

Arikara
Pawnee
These may be descendants of Late Prehistoric Central Plains Tradition cultures that lived in southwest Iowa, especially around the present-day Glenwood area. The Pawnee (Panis) are shown in southwest Iowa in a 1798 map, although they ranged primarily to the west.

Algonquian speakers

Tribes from the early historical period:
Illinois Confederacy (including Moingona, Peoria, and Piankashaw)
Kickapoo. A subgroup occupied the Upper Iowa River region in the late 1600s and early 1700s; they may have been called the "Mahouea". 
Mascouten
Meskwaki (Fox)
Sauk
The encroachment of Europeans and long-term conflict among Algonquian and Iroquoian tribes in the east pushed many eastern tribes into the Midwest. The Meskwaki have maintained a presence in Iowa, even after official removal in 1846. They established a recognized Settlement.

Iroquoian speakers
The Wyandot (Huron) were Iroquoian speakers from the early historical period. Again, the encroachment of Europeans and long-term conflict between Algonquian and Iroquoian tribes in the east pushed these tribes into the Midwest.

Moved into Iowa

These tribes moved to Iowa during the historic period:
Potawatomi
Ojibwe (Chippewa)
Odawa (Ottawa)
The forced relocation of tribes in the 19th century from east of the Mississippi led to some eastern tribes living in and near Iowa. Their former territory had been around the Great Lakes. Potawatomi Chief Sauganash founded the village that eventually grew into Council Bluffs.

Others
Apache and Comanche visit 17th century-19th century

Indian settlements and claimed lands in Iowa
Meskwaki Settlement, Iowa
 Blackbird Bend

Notable Indians who lived in Iowa

Appanoose
Antonine Barada (White Horse)
Black Hawk
Douglas Spotted Eagle 
Inkpaduta
Keokuk
Mahaska "White Cloud"
Neapope
Maria Pearson
Poweshiek
Quashquame
John Raymond Rice
Sauganash (Billy Caldwell)
Sidominadota
Taimah (Tama)
Wabansi
Wapello
Watseka
Ray Young Bear
Notchininga "No Heart"

References

 Indians
 
Iowa
Iowa